Tennessee Christmas: A Holiday Collection is a compilation from Point of Grace's two holiday releases, A Christmas Story, released in 1999 and Winter Wonderland, released in 2005. It is the first holiday release by the group as a trio. In it, they revisited Amy Grant's memorable "Tennessee Christmas." The album was released along with How You Live: Deluxe Edition in October 2008 by Word Records.

Track listing
 "It's the Most Wonderful Time of the Year" - 2:52 *From Winter Wonderland
 "Jingle Bells" - 4:18 *From Winter Wonderland
 "Winter Wonderland" - 3:14 *From Winter Wonderland
 "Let It Snow, Let It Snow, Let It Snow / Sleigh Ride" - 4:10 *From A Christmas Story
 "Let There Be Light" featuring John David Webster - 4:42 *From Winter Wonderland
 "Little Town" - 3:59 *From Winter Wonderland
 "Santa Claus Is Comin' to Town" - 2:35 *From A Christmas Story
 "Jingle Bell Rock" - 3:06 *From A Christmas Story
 "Emmanuel, God With Us / O Come, O Come, Emmanuel" - 4:59 *From A Christmas Story
 "Angels We Have Heard On High" - 5:54 *From A Christmas Story
 "For Unto Us" - 4:50 *From Winter Wonderland
 "O Holy Night!" - 4:55 *From A Christmas Story
 "Joy to the World" - 0:59 *From A Christmas Story
 "Breath of Heaven (Mary's Song)" - 5:33 *From Winter Wonderland
 "Tennessee Christmas" - 4:23 *New Recording

Personnel

Credits for "Tennessee Christmas" 
Point of Grace
 Shelley Breen – vocals 
 Leigh Cappillino – vocals 
 Denise Jones – vocals 

Musicians
 Blair Masters – acoustic piano 
 J.T. Corenflos – electric guitar 
 Ilya Toshinsky – acoustic guitar 
 Paul Franklin – steel guitar 
 Matt Pierson – bass 
 Dan Needham – drums 
 Carl Marsh – arrangements 
 Wes Hightower – vocal arrangements

Production 
 Brown Bannister – producer, additional engineer 
 Tim Marshall – executive producer 
 Steve Bishir – recording, mixing 
 Traci Sterling Bishir – production manager 
 Katherine Petillo – art direction
 Don Bailey – design 
 Kristin Barlowe – photography 
 Debbie Dover – hair stylist 
 Kim Perrett – wardrobe 

Point of Grace albums
2008 Christmas albums
Christmas compilation albums
Christmas albums by American artists
Albums produced by Brown Bannister